Asher Levine (born March 12, 1988) is an American fashion designer. He is the designer for his eponymous progressive label, Asher Levine, known for its mad-scientist-meets-luxe aesthetic and pioneering fabrication techniques.

Early life and education 
Levine was raised in Port Charlotte, Florida, where he began sewing at the age of 10 and attended Port Charlotte High School. Shortly after he graduated from PCHS in 2006, Levine got on a plane and moved to New York City to attend Pace University where he experimented with design in the underground avant-garde nightlife scene. He graduated from the University in 2010 with a degree in 'Business Management and Entrepreneurship.'

Career 
Shortly before graduation, he founded his label and became the go-to designer for many performance artists. He has almost two decades of experience and training in clothing construction. Levine's designs are defined by its fusion of art and fashion, which challenge, if not broaden, peoples' understandings of silhouettes, proportions, and textures. Much inspiration is drawn from the natural world and the socio-political psychology of contemporary art and youth culture.

Levine is best known for designing and fabricating custom garments worn by the Black Eyed Peas, Will.i.am, Bruno Mars, Whoopi Goldberg, Scissor Sisters, Sam Sparro, Dangerous Muse, Adam Lambert, Johnny Weir, La Roux, Cazwell, Peaches, Rita Ora, comedian Caroline Reid's aka “Pam Ann”, Jim Steinman, and - Taylor Swift - for her record-breaking Bad Blood Music Video. Swift's video, which debuted at the 2015 Billboard Music Awards, attracted over 1 Billion Views on Vevo.com, YouTube, Xbox, Roku, and other Vevo platforms. The designer has also worked with Lady Gaga.  on several occasions, including for her "Marry the Night  music video.

Though custom designs have formed the foundation of the label's notoriety, his debut women's and mainline menswear collection have begun to garner attention of its own. Levine's earlier designs were featured in the November 2011 issue of Vogue Italia, photographed by Emma Summerton and styled by legendary stylist, Patti Wilson. His designs have also been featured in major publications such as i-D, Numéro, Interview Magazine, L'Uomo Vogue, Vogue and Rolling Stone.

For his latest collection, Levine utilized draped boiled wools, molded leather scales and accessories, exotic furs, and laser cut crepe silks that encompass his perspective on fashion. This collection brings his mad scientist meets luxe aesthetic and cutting edge body scanning technology into an intimate setting reminiscent of the original Paris shows of the 1930s. Most of Levine’s work focuses on made to measure and local manufacturing. Asher Levine is known for incorporating technology within clothing, but this is the first time he enhances the manufacturing process with intelligent optical measurement software.

His designs explore the interplay and fusion of textile innovation and technological advancements all to re-envision the human experience, through collaborating with pioneers and their respective fields. Levine's interest in technology was also seen in one of his previous collections,  where he transformed “fashion into function” as noted by MTV Style journalist, Chrissy Mahlmeister. The designer partnered with software developer, PhoneHalo to showcase clothing and accessories with embedded microchips that communicate with your smartphone. The microchips possess GPS locating technology enabled through an application that is readily downloadable to any smartphone.

Levine further demonstrates his talent for developing “science fashion” looks (wrote Tyler Malone of PMc Magazine) by creating his own fabrics through intricate construction, molding and sculpting techniques. For instance, he utilizes materials such as silicone, neoprene, and high-performance polyurethane.

His collections exhibit various methods of molding and casting to construct various items in the collection.  These innovations can be seen in the three-dimensional hounds tooth printed moto-jacket.  The raised print was created by enlarging the relief carving of a traditional houndstooth print onto a rubberized material slab to generate yards of silicone fabric. The final result is a reinterpretation and marriage of the classic motorcycle jacket with a new take on the traditional houndstooth print. He demonstrated his talent for combining fashion and technological innovation by collaborating with MakerBot Industries, the leading innovator of 3D printing. The partnership led to the first-ever pair of 3D printed sunglasses for the collection leading to CNN writer Laurie Segall calling it “the hottest accessory on the runway at [New York] Fashion Week”. Besides ceaselessly creating and pushing the boundaries of modern fashion, Levine has also been a guest lecturer at higher education institutions such as Stanford University, Fashion Institute of Technology, and Pace University.

Levine's skill set is not solely limited to his highly conceptual pieces.  His implementation of cutting-edge textiles and construction can be seen in his collections staple pieces such as sweatshirts, pants, gloves and even a weekend bag.  Levine's methods and aesthetic are far from ordinary, and his point of view is unlike any of his contemporaries.  Due to Levine's unique and innovative fabrication processes and stand-out style, he has become a pioneer of avant-garde fashion, and is quickly becoming “one of Hollywood’s favorite emerging designers”.

References

External links 
 
 

1988 births
21st-century American businesspeople
American fashion businesspeople
American fashion designers
Businesspeople from Florida
Businesspeople from New York City
Gay men
American LGBT businesspeople
LGBT fashion designers
LGBT people from Florida
LGBT people from New York (state)
Living people
Pace University alumni
People from Port Charlotte, Florida
Port Charlotte High School alumni
21st-century LGBT people